Bilateral copyright agreements of the United States are agreements between the United States and another country which allow U.S. authors to claim copyright protection in the other country and authors from that country to claim protection under United States copyright law.

The agreements can take one of two forms with respect to the United States:
An exchange of notes, which is given effect in U.S. law by a Presidential proclamation under
International Copyright Act of 1891 (March 3, 1891)
Copyright Act of 1909 (March 4, 1909), later Title 17 of the United States Code
Act of December 18, 1919, which extended the period of time available to complete copyright formalities in the U.S. to take account of World War I
Act of September 25, 1941, which extended the period of time available to complete copyright formalities in the U.S. to take account of World War II
Copyright Act of 1976, which completely restated Title 17, notably 17 U.S.C. 104(b)(6)
Uruguay Round Agreements Act, codified as 17 U.S.C. 104A(g), which deals with restored copyrights
A treaty ratified by the United States Senate, which has direct effect under
Copyright Act of 1909
Copyright Act of 1976 (17 U.S.C. 104(b) and 104A)
Treaties which deal only with copyright matters are usually known as "conventions": however, certain other treaties (e.g., peace treaties) also contain provisions concerning copyright.

Countries affected 

It is impossible to give a definitive list of countries which are affected by the proclamations listed below. The law of
succession of states allows for the de facto continuation of a treaty or agreement when a territory becomes
independent, and many of the proclamations had effect in former dependent territories.

The United States Department of State has the responsibility to determine whether an agreement is still in force or not with respect to a
given territory: it does not make this determination unless there is an actual case in question. For several former dependent
territories, the question has yet to be posed and the status of their copyright relations with the United States is listed as
"uncertain" by the U.S. Copyright Office.

If the country concerned has continued to protect U.S. copyrighted works since independence, the agreement may be considered to be still in force: under U.S. law, the decision lies with the Secretary of State. The President also has the option of issuing a proclamation under 17 U.S.C. 104A, which has the effect of recognizing the copyrights of the country concerned but provides safeguards for anyone who has used
works in the United States while believing they were in the public domain. This latter option has been used once since it was introduced by the Uruguay Round Agreements Act in 1994, with respect to Vietnam.

Effect of the Copyright Act of 1976 
Proclamations issued before 1978-01-01, the effective date of the Copyright Act of 1976, remain in force under section 104 of that Act, which provides that: "All proclamations issued by the President under section 1(e) or 9(b) of title 17 as it existed on December 31, 1977, or under previous copyright statutes of the United States, shall continue in force until terminated, suspended, or revised by the President."

Chronological list 
, the U.S. State Department lists the following bilateral treaties in force.

See also 
 International copyright agreements
 List of parties to international copyright agreements
 List of parties to international related rights treaties

References 

United States copyright law